Quantum programming is the process of assembling sequences of instructions, called quantum circuits, that are capable of running on a quantum computer. Quantum programming languages help express quantum algorithms using high-level constructs. The field is deeply rooted in the open-source philosophy and as a result most of the quantum software discussed in this article is freely available as open-source software.

Quantum instruction sets 
Quantum instruction sets are used to turn higher level algorithms into physical instructions that can be executed on quantum processors. Sometimes these instructions are specific to a given hardware platform, e.g. ion traps or superconducting qubits.

cQASM 
cQASM, also known as common QASM, is a hardware-agnostic quantum assembly language which guarantees the interoperability between all the quantum compilation and simulation tools. It was introduced by the QCA Lab at TUDelft.

Quil 

Quil is an instruction set architecture for quantum computing that first introduced a shared quantum/classical memory model. It was introduced by Robert Smith, Michael Curtis, and William Zeng in A Practical Quantum Instruction Set Architecture.  Many quantum algorithms (including quantum teleportation, quantum error correction, simulation, and optimization algorithms) require a shared memory architecture.

OpenQASM 

OpenQASM is the intermediate representation introduced by IBM for use with Qiskit and the IBM Q Experience.

Blackbird 
Blackbird is a quantum instruction set and intermediate representation used by Xanadu Quantum Technologies and Strawberry Fields. It is designed to represent continuous-variable quantum programs that can run on photonic quantum hardware.

Quantum software development kits 
Quantum software development kits provide collections of tools to create and manipulate quantum programs. They also provide the means to simulate the quantum programs or prepare them to be run using cloud-based quantum devices and self-hosted quantum devices.

SDKs with access to quantum processors 
The following software development kits can be used to run quantum circuits on prototype quantum devices, as well as on simulators.

Perceval 
Simulations are run either on the user's own computer or on the cloud. Perceval is also used to connect to Quandela's cloud-based photonic quantum processor.

Ocean 
An Open Source suite of tools developed by D-Wave. Written mostly in the Python programming language, it enables users to formulate problems in Ising Model and Quadratic Unconstrained Binary Optimization formats (QUBO). Results can be obtained by submitting to an online quantum computer in Leap, D-Wave's real-time Quantum Application Environment, customer-owned machines, or classical samplers.

ProjectQ 
An Open Source project developed at the Institute for Theoretical Physics at ETH, which uses the Python programming language to create and manipulate quantum circuits. Results are obtained either using a simulator, or by sending jobs to IBM quantum devices.

Qiskit 

An Open Source project developed by IBM. Quantum circuits are created and manipulated using Python. Results are obtained either using simulators that run on the user's own device, simulators provided by IBM or prototype quantum devices provided by IBM. As well as the ability to create programs using basic quantum operations, higher level tools for algorithms and benchmarking are available within specialized packages. Qiskit is based on the OpenQASM standard for representing quantum circuits. It also  supports pulse level control of quantum systems via QiskitPulse standard.

Qibo 
An open source full-stack API for quantum simulation, quantum hardware control and calibration developed by multiple research laboratories, including QRC, CQT and INFN. Qibo is a modular framework which includes multiple backends for quantum simulation and hardware control. This project aims at providing a platform agnostic quantum hardware control framework with drivers for multiple instruments and tools for quantum calibration, characterization and validation. This framework focuses on self-hosted quantum devices by simplifying the software development required in labs.

Forest 
An open source project developed by Rigetti, which uses the Python programming language to create and manipulate quantum circuits. Results are obtained either using simulators or prototype quantum devices provided by Rigetti. As well as the ability to create programs using basic quantum operations, higher level algorithms are available within the Grove package. Forest is based on the Quil instruction set.

t|ket> 
A quantum programming environment and optimizing compiler developed by Cambridge Quantum Computing that targets simulators and several quantum hardware back-ends, released in December 2018.

Strawberry Fields 
An open-source Python library developed by Xanadu Quantum Technologies for designing, simulating, and optimizing continuous variable (CV) quantum optical circuits. Three simulators are provided - one in the Fock basis, one using the Gaussian formulation of quantum optics, and one using the TensorFlow machine learning library. Strawberry Fields is also the library for executing programs on Xanadu's quantum photonic hardware.

PennyLane 
An open-source Python library developed by Xanadu Quantum Technologies for differentiable programming of quantum computers. PennyLane provides users the ability to create models using TensorFlow, NumPy, or PyTorch, and connect them with quantum computer backends available from IBMQ, Google Quantum, Rigetti, Quantinuum and Alpine Quantum Technologies.

Quantum Development Kit 
A project developed by Microsoft as part of the .NET Framework. Quantum programs can be written and run within Visual Studio and VSCode using the quantum programming language Q#.  Programs developed in the QDK can be run on Microsoft's Azure Quantum, and run on quantum computers from Quantinuum, IonQ, and Pasqal.

Cirq 

An Open Source project developed by Google, which uses the Python programming language to create and manipulate quantum circuits.  Programs written in Cirq can be run on IonQ, Pasqal, Rigetti, and Alpine Quantum Technologies.

Quantum programming languages 
There are two main groups of quantum programming languages: imperative quantum programming languages and functional quantum programming languages.

Imperative languages 
The most prominent representatives of the imperative languages are QCL, LanQ and Q|SI>.

QCL 

Quantum Computation Language (QCL) is one of the first implemented quantum programming languages. The most important feature of QCL is the support for user-defined operators and functions. Its syntax resembles the syntax of the C programming language and its classical data types are similar to primitive data types in C. One can combine classical code and quantum code in the same program.

Quantum pseudocode 
Quantum pseudocode proposed by E. Knill is the first formalized language for description of quantum algorithms.  It was introduced and, moreover, was tightly connected with a model of quantum machine called Quantum Random Access Machine (QRAM).

Q# 

A language developed by Microsoft to be used with the Quantum Development Kit.

Q|SI> 
Q|SI> is a platform embedded in .Net language supporting quantum programming in a quantum extension of while-language. This platform includes a compiler of the quantum while-language and a chain of tools for the simulation of quantum computation, optimisation of quantum circuits, termination analysis of quantum programs, and verification of quantum programs.

Q language 
Q Language is the second implemented imperative quantum programming language. Q Language was implemented as an extension of C++ programming language. It provides classes for basic quantum operations like QHadamard, QFourier, QNot, and QSwap, which are derived from the base class Qop.  New operators can be defined using C++ class mechanism.

Quantum memory is represented by class Qreg.
Qreg x1; // 1-qubit quantum register with initial value 0
Qreg x2(2,0); // 2-qubit quantum register with initial value 0

The computation process is executed using a provided simulator. Noisy environments can be simulated using parameters of the simulator.

qGCL 
Quantum Guarded Command Language (qGCL) was defined by P. Zuliani in his PhD thesis. It is based on Guarded Command Language created by Edsger Dijkstra.

It can be described as a language of quantum programs specification.

QMASM 
Quantum Macro Assembler (QMASM) is a low-level language specific to quantum annealers such as the D-Wave.

Scaffold 
Scaffold is C-like language, that compiles to QASM and OpenQASM.  It is built on top of the LLVM Compiler Infrastructure to perform optimizations on Scaffold code before generating a specified instruction set.

Silq 
Silq is a high-level programming language for quantum computing with a strong static type system, developed at ETH Zürich.

LQP 
The Logic of Quantum Programs (LQP) is a dynamic quantum logic, capable of expressing important features of quantum measurements and unitary evolutions of multi-partite states, and provides logical characterizations of various forms of entanglement. The logic has been used to specify and verify the correctness of various protocols in quantum computation.

Functional languages 
Efforts are underway to develop functional programming languages for quantum computing. Functional programming languages are well-suited for reasoning about programs. Examples include Selinger's QPL, and the Haskell-like language QML by Altenkirch and Grattage. Higher-order quantum programming languages, based on lambda calculus, have been proposed by van Tonder, Selinger and Valiron and by Arrighi and Dowek.

QFC and QPL 
QFC and QPL are two closely related quantum programming languages defined by Peter Selinger. They differ only in their syntax: QFC uses a flow chart syntax, whereas QPL uses a textual syntax. These languages have classical control flow but can operate on quantum or classical data. Selinger gives a denotational semantics for these languages in a category of superoperators.

QML 
QML is a Haskell-like quantum programming language by Altenkirch and Grattage. Unlike Selinger's QPL, this language takes duplication, rather than discarding, of quantum information as a primitive operation. QML also introduces both classical and quantum control operators, whereas most other languages rely on classical control.

An operational semantics for QML is given in terms of quantum circuits, while a denotational semantics is presented in terms of superoperators, and these are shown to agree. Both the operational and denotational semantics have been implemented (classically) in Haskell.

LIQUi|> 
LIQUi|> (pronounced liquid) is a quantum simulation extension on the F# programming language. It is currently being developed by the Quantum Architectures and Computation Group (QuArC) part of the StationQ efforts at Microsoft Research. LIQUi|> seeks to allow theorists to experiment with quantum algorithm design before physical quantum computers are available for use.

It includes a programming language, optimization and scheduling algorithms, and quantum simulators. LIQUi|> can be used to translate a quantum algorithm written in the form of a high-level program into the low-level machine instructions for a quantum device.

Quantum lambda calculi 
Quantum lambda calculi are extensions of the classical lambda calculus introduced by Alonzo Church and Stephen Cole Kleene in the 1930s. The purpose of quantum lambda calculi is to extend quantum programming languages with a theory of higher-order functions.

The first attempt to define a quantum lambda calculus was made by Philip Maymin in 1996.
His lambda-q calculus is powerful enough to express any quantum computation. However, this language can efficiently solve NP-complete problems, and therefore appears to be strictly stronger than the standard quantum computational models (such as the quantum Turing machine or the quantum circuit model). Therefore, Maymin's lambda-q calculus is probably not implementable on a physical device .

In 2003, André van Tonder defined an extension of the lambda calculus suitable for proving correctness of quantum programs. He also provided an implementation in the Scheme programming language.

In 2004, Selinger and Valiron defined a strongly typed lambda calculus for quantum computation with a type system based on linear logic.

Quipper 

Quipper was published in 2013. It is implemented as an embedded language, using Haskell as the host language. For this reason, quantum programs written in Quipper are written in Haskell using provided libraries. For example, the following code implements preparation of a superposition

import Quipper

spos :: Bool -> Circ Qubit
spos b = do q <- qinit b
            r <- hadamard q
            return r

funQ 
A group of undergraduate students at Chalmers University of Technology developed a functional quantum programming language in 2021. It is inspired by the quantum typed lambda calculus by Selinger and Valiron. The underlying quantum simulator is a part of a Haskell library by the same name. The following code implements superposition in funQ:

spos : !(Bit -o QBit)
spos b = H (new b)

The same example in the Haskell library would be:

import FunQ

spos :: Bit -> QM QBit
spos b = hadamard =<< new b

References

Further reading

External links 
 Curated list of all quantum open-source software projects
 Bibliography on Quantum Programming Languages (updated in May 2007)
 Quantum Physics and Logic (QPL) Conference Series (L stood for 'Languages' until 2006)
 Quantum programming language in Quantiki
 QMASM documentation
pyQuil documentation including Introduction to Quantum Computing
 Scaffold Source

 
Programming language classification
Programming paradigms
Quantum computing